is a Japanese politician of the Liberal Democratic Party (LDP), a member of the House of Representatives in the Diet (national legislature). A native of Shinjuku, Tokyo and a graduate of Keio University, he worked at the Industrial Bank of Japan from 1981 to 1993. He was elected to the House of Representatives for the first time in 2000 as a member of the Democratic Party of Japan after running unsuccessfully in 1996 as a member of the New Frontier Party. He later joined the LDP.

References

External links 
  in Japanese.

Members of the House of Representatives (Japan)
Keio University alumni
Living people
1958 births
People from Shinjuku
New Frontier Party (Japan) politicians
20th-century Japanese politicians
Democratic Party of Japan politicians
Liberal Democratic Party (Japan) politicians
21st-century Japanese politicians